Temnora spiritus is a moth of the family Sphingidae. It is known from forests from Sierra Leone to Congo, Uganda and western Kenya.

The length of the forewings is 19–20 mm. It is similar in shape and markings to Temnora plagiata plagiata but much paler overall, dark buff to creamy buff. The forewing outer margin is denticulate and the apex truncate-sinuate. The forewing upperside has a costal patch which is narrower than in Temnora plagiata plagiata. The hindwing is shaded with burnt amber-brown. The marginal band is brown

Subspecies
Temnora spiritus spiritus 
Temnora spiritus akissi Pierre, 1989 (Nigeria)

References

Temnora
Moths described in 1893
Moths of Africa